1991 JSL Cup Final was the 16th final of the JSL Cup competition. The final was played at Nagoya Mizuho Athletics Stadium in Aichi on September 1, 1991. Yomiuri won the championship.

Overview
Yomiuri won their 3rd title, by defeating Honda 4–3 with Nobuhiro Takeda, Toninho, Kazuyoshi Miura and Tsuyoshi Kitazawa goal.

Match details

See also
1991 JSL Cup

References

JSL Cup
1991 in Japanese football
Tokyo Verdy matches